Aldo Lado (born 5 December 1934) is an Italian film and television director, screenwriter and author. He is known internationally for his contributions to the giallo genre during the 1970's, through his films Short Night of Glass Dolls (1971) and Who Saw Her Die? (1972). Several of his films are considered cult classics.

Biography 
Lado was born in Fiume, Italy (today Rijeka, Croatia) on December 5, 1934.

He came up through the film industry as an assistant director, notably to Bernardo Bertolucci on The Conformist (1970). After writing the story for the 1971 giallo The Designated Victim, he made his directorial debut later that year with Short Night of Glass Dolls. Lado took the job after two previous directors, Maurizio Lucidi and Antonio Margheriti, fell through. The film was a success, and he followed it with another giallo, Who Saw Her Die?.

Lado's subsequent films were in a variety of genres, including drama (Woman Buried Alive, The Cousin), romance (La cosa buffa), and horror (Last Stop on the Night Train). In 1979, he directed the Star Wars cash-in The Humanoid, for which he was credited under the George Lucas-esque pseudonym "George B. Lewis". In 1981, he directed the Alberto Moravia adaptation La disubbidienza.

In 2013, after a 20-year hiatus, he directed the film Il Notturno di Chopin.

Lado published his first short story in 2016, in the anthology Nuovi delitti di lago. In 2017 he published I film che non vedrete mai ('The films you will never see'), a compilation based on Lado's own unproduced screenplays.

Filmography

Film

Television

Bibliography 

 Il gigante e la bambina, in Nuovi delitti di lago, Morellini Editore, 2016, ISBN 9788862984393.
 Cold Case sul Lago Maggiore, in Delitti di lago, vol. 3, Morellini Editore, 2017, ISBN 9788862984935.
 I film che non vedrete mai, Angera Films, 2017, ISBN 9788894277708.
 Un pollo da spennare, Angera Films, 2018, ISBN 9788894277722.
 Hotel delle cose, Angera Films, 2018, ISBN 9788894277760.
 Il mastino, Angera Films, 2018, ISBN 9788894277746.
 Ombre scure sotto la Rocca di Angera, in Delitti di lago, vol. 4, Morellini Editore, 2020, ISBN 9788862987448.
 Storie di donne: MIRIAM, Edizioni Angerafilm 2020, ISBN 9791280098016
 IL RIDER, Edizioni Angerafilm 2020 , ISBN 9791280098009
 Storie di donne: COSTANZA, Edizioni Angerafilm 2021, ISBN 9791280098023

References

External links
 
 

1934 births
Living people
Italian film directors
Italian male screenwriters
People from Rijeka
Giallo film directors

Italian male novelists
Italian male short story writers